Raleigh County is one of the 141 Cadastral divisions of New South Wales. It includes Nambucca Heads, and lies south of the Bellinger River.

The origin of the name "Raleigh County" is unknown.

Parishes within this county
A full list of parishes found within this county; their current LGA and mapping coordinates to the approximate centre of each location is as follows:

References

Counties of New South Wales